The following articles cover the presidential trips made by Donald Trump as President of the United States:

 List of international presidential trips made by Donald Trump
 List of presidential trips made by Donald Trump (2017)
 List of presidential trips made by Donald Trump (2018)
 List of presidential trips made by Donald Trump (2019)
 List of presidential trips made by Donald Trump (2020–21)

See also
 List of post-2016 election Donald Trump rallies
 Presidency of Donald Trump

Presidency of Donald Trump
Trump, Donald
2010s in the United States
2020s in the United States
trips